Austin William Evans (born 3 June 1968) is an Australian politician. He was a Nationals member of the New South Wales Legislative Assembly from 14 October 2017 to 23 March 2019, representing Murray since a by-election held to replace Adrian Piccoli.

Evans grew up in Narrandera and worked for an irrigation company in Coleambally. He was the last mayor of Murrumbidgee Shire before its amalgamation with Jerilderie Shire, and served as administrator of the resulting Murrumbidgee Council from 2016 to 2017. He was elected to the new council in 2017.

References

1968 births
Living people
Members of the New South Wales Legislative Assembly
National Party of Australia members of the Parliament of New South Wales
People from the Riverina
Mayors of places in New South Wales